Eois numida is a moth in the family Geometridae first described by Herbert Druce in 1892. It is found in South America, Mexico and Costa Rica.

References

Moths described in 1892
Eois
Moths of North America